Gliese 832 c (also known as Gl 832 c or GJ 832 c) is an extrasolar planet candidate located approximately 16 light-years (4.93 parsecs, or about 151.4 trillion km) away in the constellation of Grus, orbiting the star Gliese 832, a red dwarf. Existence of the planet was disputed in 2022, after finding its putative orbital period close to the rotation period of the parent star.

It is in its star's habitable zone and a big reason for its high rating is it receives the same amount of solar flux as the earth in the habitable exoplanets catalog. The planet has a mass of 5.2 Earth's masses and an estimated radius of >1.5 Earth radii.

To date, it is the fifth-closest known potentially habitable exoplanet to Earth. The closest potentially habitable exoplanet is Proxima Centauri b at 4.244 light years. Second is Ross 128 b at 10.92 light years away, followed by Luyten b (and not counting the unconfirmed planets Tau Ceti e and f). Fourthly is Wolf 1061c at 13.8 light years from the sun.

Characteristics Of Gliese 832 c

Mass, radius, and temperature
Gliese 832 c has a mass of approximately 5.2 times that of Earth. If it had the same density of Earth it would have a radius of around 1.75  or possibly the planet could have a higher density with a smaller radius. Its temperature is predicted to be relatively similar to Earth's, but is subject to significant swings as it orbits its star. The planet has a relatively high eccentricity, taking it very near to the predicted inner edge of the habitable zone. However, because of its large mass, it may have a dense atmosphere, which could make it much hotter and more like the planet Venus.

Host star
The planet orbits a (M-type) star named Gliese 832, orbited by a total of two known planets. The star has a mass of 0.45  and a radius of 0.48 . It has a temperature of 3620 K and is estimated to be about 9.54 billion years old. In comparison, the Sun is 4.6 billion years old and has a temperature of 5778 K.

The star's apparent magnitude, or how bright it appears from Earth's perspective, is 10.19. Therefore, it is too dim to be seen with the naked eye. It is of spectral class M2V.

Orbit
The planet orbits its host star with about 3% of the Sun's luminosity approximately every 36 days, 10 times shorter than earth's year. and an orbital radius 0.162 times that of Earth (compared to Mercury's orbital distance of 0.389 AU).

Habitability

The planet is a super-Earth mass planet orbiting in its star's habitable zone. Although it orbits its star much closer than the Earth orbits the Sun, it orbits a red dwarf, receiving approximately as much energy from it as the Earth does from its star. It is not known whether Gliese 832 c transits its host star, something which would be required in order to detect any atmosphere the planet may have and determine its composition.

Its host star (Gliese 832) has 45% of the Sun's mass, and as a result, stars like Gliese 832 have the ability to live up to 50–60 billion years, 5–6 times longer than the Sun will live.

The planet is likely tidally locked, with one side of its hemisphere permanently facing towards the star, while the opposite side shrouded in eternal darkness. However, between these two intense areas, there would be a sliver of habitability – called the terminator line, where the temperatures may be suitable (about ) for liquid water to exist. Additionally, a much larger portion of the planet may be habitable if it supports a thick enough atmosphere to transfer heat to the side facing away from the star.

In the case that Gliese 832 c possesses a Venusian-like atmosphere, which it could have due to its eccentric orbit (and the stellar flux reaching 1.45 S🜨, high enough to boil any oceans on its surface), the planet would be inhospitable because of a runaway greenhouse effect on its surface. Little amounts of carbon dioxide would have been present, as Gliese 832 c was/is probably an ocean planet. The surface pressure would have also increased to around 100 times Earth's surface pressure (100 kilopascals, 100 atm.) because of the amount of water vapor in the atmosphere. The net result would be that Gliese 832 c being a desert planet, rather than an ocean planet.

Discovery and impact
Gliese 832 c was discovered in 2014 by an international team of astronomers led by Robert A. Wittenmyer. It was at the time the newest and closest to earth member of the top three most Earth-like worlds in the Habitable Exoplanets Catalog.

The planet's discoverers described the planet as "the nearest best habitable world candidate so far".

Further research may be done on Gliese 832 c to see if it is suitable for life.

See also
Gliese 832 b
Extraterrestrial life
Astrobiology
List of potentially habitable exoplanets

References

External links

Artist's conception of Gliese 832
Artist's conception of Gliese 832 compared to the earth
The original study

Exoplanets discovered in 2014
Exoplanet candidates
Grus (constellation)
Gliese 832